Live at the Sands is a live DVD by Mary Wilson, recorded at the Copa Room of the Sands Hotel and Casino in Las Vegas and released in 2006.

Track listings
"I'm Every Woman"
"Love Child"
"My World Is Empty Without You"
"Reflections"
"You Can't Hurry Love"
"Come See About Me"
"Back in My Arms Again"
"Good Lovin'"
"Body and Soul"
"Fields of Gold"
"You Are So Beautiful"
"Bad Case of Lovin' You"
"Can't Get Enough of Your Love/Take Me in Your Arms"
"Baby Love"
"Stop! In the Name of Love"
"You Keep Me Hangin' On"
"U"
"One Night With You"
"Walk the Line"
"Someday We'll Be Together"
"(I Can't Get No) Satisfaction"/"Brown Sugar"
"Hero"

Personnel
 Mary Wilson - lead vocals
 Parnell Marcano - background vocals
 Iris Parker - background vocals
 Carl Jenkins - background vocals
 Donzel Davis - drums
 Ray Parnell - guitar and vocals
 Michael Lomas - bass guitar
 Peter Radd - keyboards
 Mark Zeir - keyboards

See also
 Live at the Sands (Before Frank)
 Sinatra at the Sands
 The Sounds of '66
 Lena Horne at the Sands

Production credits
 Mary Wilson - Executive Producer
 Richard Duryea - Producer

Mary Wilson (singer) albums
2006 live albums
2006 video albums
Live video albums
Albums recorded at the Sands Hotel